Twitchell Creek flows out of Twitchell Lake northwest of Big Moose, New York and flows into Stillwater Reservoir west of Woods Lake, New York.

References

Rivers of New York (state)
Rivers of Herkimer County, New York